The Limping Man is a 1953 British film noir directed by Cy Endfield and starring Lloyd Bridges, Moira Lister and Leslie Phillips. The film was made at Merton Park Studios and was based on Anthony Verney's novel Death on the Tideway. Endfield directed it under the pseudonym Charles de Lautour due to his blacklisting in Hollywood. Location shooting took place around London including The Mayflower pub in Rotherhithe.

Plot
American former soldier Frank Prior arrives in London to visit a wartime girlfriend, whom he has not seen in six years.  His plane landing at the airport coincides with a fellow passenger being killed by a sniper.

Scotland Yard inspector Braddock and detective Cameron are assigned to investigate. The dead man is carrying forged documents addressed to Kendall Brown (whom he is thus identified as), and a photograph that leads them to Pauline French, an actress.

Pauline is the woman Frank has come to see. She also happens to be an expert marksman with a rifle. After they kiss, Pauline tells Frank that she had tried unsuccessfully to notify him to delay his visit.

An autographed picture of another actress, Helene Castle, is found in Kendall Brown's flat. The detectives learn that Helene is the victim's ex-wife. In the meantime, Frank spends a few hours with Pauline on her boat. When they later go to a pub, a limping man seems to menace and unnerve Pauline, who runs away.

Pauline confesses to Frank that she once let Kendall Brown use her boat for a smuggling operation. He began blackmailing her with letters she wrote, which Helene now possesses. At the theatre, the limping man turns out to be George, the stage manager. But to everyone's shock, the late Kendall Brown turns up very much alive. The victim on the plane was a man bringing documents to Brown who saw his own apparent death as convenient.

After knocking the limping man unconscious, Kendall Brown ends up in a fistfight with Frank in the theatre's balcony. Brown and Frank fall over the railing, but as he falls, Frank jars awake and finds himself back on the plane, having dreamed the entire adventure. Brown is revealed to be one of Frank's fellow passengers, Castle the flight attendant, and Braddock and Cameron the pilots. Confused but relieved, Frank exits the plane and meets his girlfriend, Pauline French.

Cast

References

External links 

1953 films
1953 crime films
British black-and-white films
British crime films
Film noir
Films directed by Cy Endfield
Films based on British novels
Films set in England
Films set in London
Films shot in London
Merton Park Studios films
1950s English-language films
1950s British films